WEED (1390 AM) is a radio station broadcasting a gospel music format. Licensed to Rocky Mount, North Carolina, United States, it serves the Rocky Mount/Wilson area. The station is currently owned by Northstar Broadcasting Corporation.

History
WEED signed on in Greenville, North Carolina in 1933, owned by the Wynne family. After moving to Rocky Mount, WEED added an FM station which later became WRSV. Bill Wynne took over the stations from his father and ran them until Charles and Sarah Johnson bought WEED in 1988. Sarah Johnson remained as head of Northstar Broadcasting after her husband's death.

In 1994, WEED began a four-hour Spanish language program called La Pantera. By 2002, La Pantera had become a 24-hour format. Early that year, WEED began airing a Spanish version of the WRAL-TV 6 P.M. newscast. In June 2003, WEED returned to English, with News/Talk, keeping La Pantera as a part-time show. On June 1, 2005, WEED changed to Spanish Christian radio.

In 2002, following Hurricane Floyd, WEED applied for and received authorization from the FCC reduce night-time power from 2.5 kW using a 3 tower directional antenna to 28 watts non-directional using a single tower for both day and night operation. The FCC application states the middle tower of the 3 tower array was destroyed and the tuning and phasing equipment was damaged or destroyed by the hurricane.

In 2009, when it also aired Rocky Mount High School football, WEED was Old School 1390, "your new home for Old School", with an urban adult contemporary format. Other formats included urban contemporary gospel.

During 2011, WEED aired some North Carolina Central University sports events.

Also in 2011, WEED changed from "1390 the Word" to "1390 Jammin' Gospel", airing Christian programming including 15-minute programs by pastors, and a variety of music including "urban, bluegrass, Christian country, Southern or gospel blues." Freddie Williams was program director and the only DJ. Since then Donnell Bryant has been added as one of the daytime radio announcers on the all new 24hr all gospel format.

References

External links

EED
Radio stations established in 1933
Gospel radio stations in the United States